Grant A.M.E. Church is a historic church at 4th and Washington Street in Chesilhurst, Camden County, New Jersey, United States.

It was built in 1896 and added to the National Register of Historic Places in 1977.

See also 
National Register of Historic Places listings in Camden County, New Jersey

References 

Churches on the National Register of Historic Places in New Jersey
Churches completed in 1896
Churches in Camden County, New Jersey
African Methodist Episcopal churches in New Jersey
National Register of Historic Places in Camden County, New Jersey
New Jersey Register of Historic Places
Chesilhurst, New Jersey